1988 JSL Cup Final was the 13th final of the JSL Cup competition. The final was played at Yokkaichi Stadium in Mie on September 11, 1988. Nissan Motors won the championship.

Overview
Nissan Motors won their 1st title, by defeating Toshiba 3–0 with Hiroshi Hirakawa and Takashi Mizunuma goal.

Match details

See also
1988 JSL Cup

References

JSL Cup
1988 in Japanese football
Yokohama F. Marinos matches
Hokkaido Consadole Sapporo matches